Komandoo  is one of the resort islands of the Lhaviyani Atoll in the Maldives. The hotel is officially rated four stars and accommodates a maximum of 130 guests in 65 beach and ocean villas.

External links 

  with webcam
 Komandoo Island Resort & Spa - Review at Nobelio.de
 Video of sea turtles around Komandoo

Islands of the Maldives